Giovanni Bonini (born 5 September 1986) is a midfielder from San Marino. He plays for Folgore and San Marino.

References

1986 births
Living people
Sammarinese footballers
San Marino international footballers
Association football midfielders